YMI Jeans is an American company which manufactures denim jeans. The company is based in Los Angeles, and was founded in 2000 by David Vered, Michael Godigian and Moshe Zaga.

In 2012, YMI began manufacturing levanta cola jeans, which enhance the buttocks. These are designed for Latina women, and are promoted with the slogan "Wanna Betta Butt?" YMI also makes "Hyper Flex" jeans, "made out of high-stretch fabric for the athleisure market."

References

Jeans by brand
Manufacturing companies based in Los Angeles
American companies established in 2000
Clothing companies established in 2000
2000 establishments in California
Clothing brands of the United States